Mikel Astarloza Chaurreau (born 17 November 1979 in Gipuzkoa, Basque Country) is a Spanish former professional road bicycle racer, who competed as a professional between 2002 and 2009, and 2011 to 2013.

Career 
In 2003 he won his first race, when he finished just in front of Lennie Kristensen in the overall rankings of the Tour Down Under. He has taken part in all editions of the Tour de France since 2003, and  won stage 16 of the 2009 Tour to record his second professional stage win in any competition (for the Euskaltel team), with his 9th position overall in 2007 as his next best attempt. His cousin Íñigo Chaurreau is also a professional cyclist.

On 26 June 2009 he tested positive on Recombinant Erythropoietin (EPO), for which he was suspended by the UCI on 31 July 2009. Astarloza denied using EPO, saying that it was "sporting suicide" to use illegal performance-enhancing drugs. On 15 May 2010, he was formally handed a two-year ban by the Spanish Cycling Federation. Astarloza continually claimed his innocence, and Euskaltel-Euskadi stated that they would rehire him once the ban ended. He indeed rejoined the Basque team in August 2011, at the Vuelta a Burgos.

Astarloza was selected to ride the 2012 Tour de France, but crashed on a big pile-up in stage 6 with  remaining with a fractured right elbow and did not finish the stage.

On 1 October 2013 Astarloza announced that he would retire from professional cycling after the 2013 Tour of Beijing.

Career achievements

Major results

2003
 1st  Overall Tour Down Under
 3rd Time trial, National Road Championships
2005
 7th Overall Bayern Rundfahrt
2007
 7th Overall Critérium du Dauphiné Libéré
 9th Overall Tour de France
 10th Overall Volta a la Comunitat Valenciana
2008
 4th Overall Vuelta a Andalucía
 4th Klasika Primavera
 5th Overall Tour de Romandie
 6th Overall Tour of the Basque Country
 7th Overall Critérium du Dauphiné Libéré
2009
 4th Klasika Primavera

Grand Tour general classification results timeline

References

External links 

Cyclists from the Basque Country (autonomous community)
Spanish male cyclists
1979 births
Living people
Doping cases in cycling
Spanish sportspeople in doping cases
People from Pasaia
Sportspeople from Gipuzkoa